Annadata is a 1954 Telugu-language drama film, produced by K. Gopala Rao under the Ashwaraj Films banner and directed by Vedantam Raghavayya. It stars Akkineni Nageswara Rao and Anjali Devi, with music composed by P. Adinarayana Rao.

The film was dubbed into Tamil-language and released in 1957.

Plot
Bangaraiah a young farmer who has devoted his life in serving people. Once there is a severe drought in their area. Bangaraiah sells his entire property and feeds people. Shanta one of the victims reaches the rescue camp and she too helps Bangaraiah to raise the funds. They all play a stage show with help of a drama company owner Kamayya Naidu which was a huge success. After that, Bangaraiah and Shanta love each other and marry and the couple is blessed with a baby girl Annapurna. Kamayya also marries a dancer Subbulu by cheating and she gives birth to an ugly baby girl, So, he leaves her. Meanwhile, Bangaraiah learns that the rescue camp caught fire, he immediately rushes there keeping Shanta and her baby under the care of Kamayya. Unfortunately, Kamayya has a bad intention on Shanta, he tries to lure her by giving some gifts when Bangaraiah returns he suspects there relation and goes away. Kamayya tries to molest Shanta but fails and he runs away exchanging their babies. Bangaraiah reaches a tribal hamlet and encourages them for combined farming. The area Zamindar impressed by it, he invites Bangaraiah and entrusts a work of a barrage construction. Shanta moves in search of Bangaraiah and with the help of Zamindar takes shelter in a temple along with Kamayya's daughter Leela. On the other side, Shanta's daughter Annapurna grows in the name of Kalyani with Kamayya and Subbulu. Years later, Zamindar dies and his heir Rangababu is in Kamayya's hands. Kamayya wants to make Kalyani's marriage with Rangababu for his property but he has already cheated Leela. Eventually, Kalyani attempts suicide because she doesn't like this proposal when Bangaraiah rescues her but Kamayya takes her back forcibly and Bangaraiah chases them. meanwhile, Leela starts to meet Rangababu and Shanta follows her. At the same time, Rangababu sends his men to blast the barrage.

Cast
Akkineni Nageswara Rao as Bangaraiah
Anjali Devi as Shanta
S. V. Ranga Rao as Kamaiah Naidu
Chalam as Rangababu
Chadalavada as Keetanna
Dr. Sivaramakrishnayya as Jatakaala Zamindar 
Surabhi Maalabai as Rangamma
Chhaya Devi as Subbulu
Ammaji as Kalyani / Annapurna
Shanta Kumari (Jr.) as Leela

Crew
Art: T. V. S. Sharma
Choreography: Vempati
Dialogues: M. V. Krishna Sarma, Dr. Balasundara Rao
Playback: A. M. Rajah, Pendyala Nageswara Rao, Madhavapeddi Satyam, M. S. Ramarao, Jikki, Krishnaveni, Padma 
Music, Lyrics: P. Adinarayana Rao
Editing: N. S. Prakasam
Cinematography: C. Nageswara Rao
Story - Producer: K. Gopala Rao and Nagisetty Mukunda Rao.
Screenplay - Director: Vedantam Raghavayya
Banner: Ashwaraj Films
Release Date: 17 December 1954

Soundtrack

The music and lyrics are by P. Adinarayana Rao. The music was released on Audio Company.

References

External links
 
 - a song from the Tamil version of the film sung by Jikki and Pazhani Baheerathi

Indian drama films
1950s Telugu-language films
Films directed by Vedantam Raghavayya
1954 drama films
Films scored by P. Adinarayana Rao
1954 films
Indian black-and-white films